The Pleasant Street School is an historic school building at 54 Pleasant Street in Spencer, Massachusetts.  The two story Victorial Eclectic brick building was designed by the Worcester firm of Fuller & Delano, and built in 1883 by J. D. Morton.  It follows a cruciform plan, with a large pavilion projecting from the main facade.  The paired main entrances (one for boys, one for girls) are on the sides of this projecting section.

The building was listed on the National Register of Historic Places in 1996,  and was included in the 2003 expansion of the Spencer Town Center Historic District.

See also
National Register of Historic Places listings in Worcester County, Massachusetts

References

School buildings on the National Register of Historic Places in Massachusetts
School buildings completed in 1883
Buildings and structures in Worcester County, Massachusetts
Spencer, Massachusetts
National Register of Historic Places in Worcester County, Massachusetts
Historic district contributing properties in Massachusetts